Igor Bunich (September 28, 1937 – June 15, 2000) was a Russian historian known for offering a number of revisionist interpretations of Russian history.  He is most famous for claiming that Joseph Stalin was actively preparing to invade western Europe in 1941 before any suggestion of the German eastward assault in Operation Barbarossa.

Operatsia Groza 
Bunich published three volumes with the title "Operatsia Groza"—"Operation Thunderstorm"—the first one in 1994, the last one posthumously in 2004. In these books he communicates a plan of Stalin for an invasion of whole Western Europe: "Operation Thunderstorm". It can be found in the so-called "Osobaya Papka", a file which contains about 100,000 Top Secret documents. In this file it is document Nr.103202/06. The paper is signed by Marshal Semyon Timoshenko and the chief of the General Staff at that time Merezkov. It is dated 18 September 1940, three months before the German "Operation Barbarossa" was signed.  After Georgy Zhukov became chief of the general staff in February 1941, the plan was called MP 41 (Mobilisatsyonni Plan 41). Bunich points to the Russian military archives, where it can be found (ZAMO, f. 15A, op.2154, d.4,l. 199-287). This document contains information about the Soviet military power in June 1941: 300 divisions, 8 million soldiers, 27,500 tanks, 32,628  airplanes. The total number of the German warplanes at that time was only about 6,000.

Bunich is not the only Russian historian who questioned the thesis of the "cowardly attack of the Wehrmacht against the peace loving Soviet Union". In 1989 appeared the book "Ledokol" (Icebreaker) by Viktor Suvorov, whose real name was Vladimir Bogdanovich Resun, in which advanced this theory. In February 1992, even the official military-historical Journal of the Russian forces—"Voenno-istorichesky Zhournal"— published an article with the heading "Unquestionable Facts of the War's Beginning", where a speech by Zhdanov, one of Stalin's intimates, expressed that the Soviet Union had already started an "aggressive foreign policy" in 1939, with the decision to attack Finland. This article also mentions that the defense efforts of the Soviet Union were impeded by the prevailing aggressive thinking of the Soviet General Staff.  These plans were extending to 1943 and to such an extent, that no effective measures against the German assault could be taken.

Bunich does not at all intend to polish up the image of Adolf Hitler. His first intention is to analyze who is guilty of having caused the immense human losses of Russia in World War II. He discovered a document, in which the total number of killed Russian soldiers is said to be 30.5 million—8.5 million of them directly killed in battle, 22 million died after from their wounds, one half of them through tetanus. In Bunich's view Stalin is not the main responsible for these human losses, but Zhukov. Stalin was a statesman but not a soldier, in strategic questions he had to rely on the advice of his generals, and Zhukov was not a very talented one. For example, he gave order to pile up heaps of ammunition under the bare sky in Soviet occupied Poland to a kind of Egyptian pyramids, which could be easily detected by the scout planes of the "Fliegerabteilung" of Admiral Wilhelm Canaris' "Abwehr" patrolling over this region as early as a month before the German attack. The Germans got a good picture of this monstrous mass of men and material and later easily destroyed it.

Bunich's "Operatsia Groza'" is full of yet unknown facts about the Third Reich. For example, he reveals why Reinhard Heydrich was replaced as the head of the "SD" ("Sicherheitsdienst") by Walter Schellenberg and was made instead the Governor General of Bohemia: This happened because his major rival Admiral Canaris showed Hitler the file of "Chaijm Aaron Heydrich", Heydrich's grandfather, a first violinist in the Vienna  "Hofoperette" - and who was Jewish.

Bunich mentions a remarkable talk between Walter Schellenberg and the Soviet ambassador to Germany, Vladimir Dekanozov, which took place in March 1941. Both men were secret-service veterans and this, in addition to a lot of drinks, created a friendly atmosphere between them. Dekanosov asked Schellenberg: "We heard that there exists a plan called Operation Barbarossa which means a German assault against us". Schellenberg remained quiet for a while and then said: "This is correct, this plan exists and it was elaborated with great thoroughness. We communicated this plan through secret channels to the Americans and the British, to make them believe that we are preparing to attack you. If they believe it, we have a good chance to succeed with our "Operation Seelöwe". - But, we also know about Your "Operation Grom"" ("Grom" means thunder and "Grosa" thunderstorm). Dekanosov informed Stalin about this talk with Schellenberg - and Stalin decided to believe Schellenberg!

Only days before "Barbarossa" began, it turned out that Merezkov, its author, betrayed "Grosa" to the Germans. According to Bunich, the German invasion of June 22, 1941 succeeded in the beginning because large segments of the Red Army surrendered or fled into forests and deserted. Adding to the confusion was Stalin's order to initiate the "Grosa" plan to attack.

Also, some people gradually realized that Adolf Hitler and the Germans saw them as "sub humans" (Untermenschen). On that ground the resistance movement came into being and Stalin was able to lead this war known as the Great Patriotic War. On the backside of the cover of "Operatsiya Grosa" Bunich mentions that Stalin had decided to start his attack against Western Europe on July 10, 1941.

External links 
 The Party's Gold by Igor Bunich - free full text 
 The Sword of the President 
 Igor Bunich's obituary 

20th-century Russian historians
1937 births
2000 deaths
Pseudohistorians